Prunus lycioides is a species of wild almond native to Turkey, northern Syria and Iran. It is a very thorny and dense shrub 0.6 to 1.2m tall. Its bark is gray and its flower petals are pink to deep pink, with its sepals and hypanthia deep red to purple. It is morphologically similar to Prunus erioclada, P. spinosissima, P. eburnea and P. brahuica. It can be distinguished from the similar species by its longer, narrower leaves, which are linear, linearlanceolate, or linearoblanceolate, and by subtle characters of its endocarp. Adapted to extremely dry conditions, it is found growing in a wide variety of arid and semiarid habitats, at 450 to 2200m above sea level.

References

lycioides
Flora of Iran
Flora of Syria
Flora of Turkey
Plants described in 1906